Bart McKay Davis (born March 7, 1955) is an American attorney and politician who served as the United States Attorney for the District of Idaho from 2017 to 2021. He previously served as a Republican member of the Idaho Senate, representing District 33 from 2002 to 2017. He represented District 29 from 1998 to 2002. During his time in the Idaho Senate, he served as state senate majority leader.

Early life and education
Born in Rapid City, South Dakota, Davis was raised in Idaho Falls, Idaho. Davis received a Bachelor of Arts in English from Brigham Young University in 1978 and a Juris Doctor in 1980 from the University of Idaho College of Law.

Career
Following his graduation from law school, Davis began his legal practice in Idaho Falls. He is admitted to practice before the Idaho Supreme Court, the United States District Court for the District of Idaho, the United States District Court for the District of Arizona, the United States Court of Appeals for the Ninth Circuit, and the United States Supreme Court. In 1990, he was co-counsel with former solicitor general Rex Lee in Davis v. United States before the United States Supreme Court. Davis' parents were the petitioners in the case. Since 2001, Davis has represented Idaho as a commissioner on the Uniform Law Commission. He is a past chairman of the Council of State Governments.

Idaho Senate
In 1998, six-term incumbent Senator John Hansen did not seek reelection to the Idaho Senate. Davis ran for the open seat and was elected. He served as Majority Caucus Chair from 2000 to 2002, and from 2002 to 2017 has served as Senate Majority Leader.

U.S. Attorney
In June 2017, President Donald Trump appointed him to become the next United States Attorney in the United States District Court for the District of Idaho. The Senate Judiciary Committee on September 7, 2017, approved his recommendation by a unanimous voice vote. He was confirmed by United States Senate by voice vote on September 14, 2017.

On February 8, 2021, he along with 55 other Trump-era attorneys were asked to resign. On February 11, 2021, Davis submitted his resignation, effective February 28.

Redistricting 
Senator Pro-Tem Chuck Winder appointed Davis to Idaho's Independent Redistricting Commission. Davis serves as co-chair of the commission.

Personal life 
He married Marion Woffinden Davis in 1976 and together they have six children.

Writing
 Bart Davis, Kate Kelly, and Kristin Ford, Use of Legislative History: Willow Witching for Legislative Intent, 43 Idaho College of Law Review 585 (2007).
 Bart Davis, Idaho's Messy History with Term Limits: A Modest Response, 52 Idaho College of Law Review 463 (2016).

Electoral history

References

External links 
 Biography at U.S. Department of Justice
 Idaho Legislature - Senator Bart Davis - official government site

|-

|-

1955 births
Living people
21st-century American politicians
1998 Idaho elections
Brigham Young University alumni
Idaho lawyers
Republican Party Idaho state senators
Latter Day Saints from Idaho
People from Idaho Falls, Idaho
Politicians from Rapid City, South Dakota
United States Attorneys for the District of Idaho
University of Idaho alumni
University of Idaho College of Law alumni